The second season of Ikki Tousen, titled Ikki Tousen: Dragon Destiny, is an anime television series based on the manga by Yuji Shiozaki, published by Wani Books and serialized in the seinen manga magazine Comic GUM. A second season, titled , aired 12 episodes on AT-X between February 26, 2007 and May 14, 2007, with subsequent broadcasts on Chiba TV, KBS Kyoto, TV Kanagawa, Tokyo MX, Sun Television, TV Aichi, and TV Saitama. Produced by ARMS, the series is directed by Koichi Ohata, series composition by Takao Yoshioka, music by Yasuharu Takanashi, characters by Rin-Sin, and produced by Osamu Koshinaka, Shinsaku Tanaka, Takuro Hatakeyama, and Yoshikazu Beniya. The anime is licensed in North America by Media Blasters. The anime is also licensed in Australia and New Zealand by Madman Entertainment, as with the first season.


Episode list

Home media

Japanese
Six DVD volumes were released by Media Factory between July 25, 2007 and November 22, 2007. The DVD volumes contain an original video animation called , featuring the female cast in a hot spring setting. A DVD box set was later released on December 22, 2009.

English
Media Blasters released the series on three DVD volumes between November 24, 2009 and April 20, 2010. A box set was later released on August 31, 2010.

References

2007 Japanese television seasons
Ikki Tousen